Pitmedden Garden is a garden in the town of Pitmedden, Aberdeenshire, Scotland. It is owned by the National Trust for Scotland. It is the largest surviving parterre in Scotland and dates from around 1675.

Notable features
The garden is noted for its geometric parterres which vary in shape from a thistle to Sir Alexander Seton's coat of arms. Pitmedden also has several long, varied borders which run along the garden walls. Sir Alexander Seton and Dame Margaret Lauder, his wife, established a house and garden at the site in 1675. The original house, together with the garden plans, was largely destroyed by fire in 1807.

The 20th century restoration based three parterre sections on the 1647 plan of Holyrood Palace by Gordon of Rothiemay, and the fourth section represents a memorial to Alexander Seton and his father John Seton.

References

Buildings and structures in Aberdeenshire
National Trust for Scotland properties
Gardens in Aberdeenshire
Inventory of Gardens and Designed Landscapes
1675 establishments in Scotland
1670s establishments in Scotland
Category A listed buildings in Aberdeenshire